Geraldo Augusto de Freitas Jr. (born September 30, 1991) is a Brazilian mixed martial artist who competed in the Bantamweight division of the Ultimate Fighting Championship.

Background
De Freitas was born and grew up in Conselheiro Lafaiete, Brazil. He began training Brazilian jiu-jitsu at the age of 11, picking up muay thai and boxing later on. At the age of 18, de Freitas moved to Belo Horizonte to study a degree in physical education and find better mixed martial arts training. However, he ended up dropping out of the college and subsequently moving to Rio de Janeiro in pursuit of professional mixed martial arts career.

Mixed martial arts career

Early career

Starting his career in 2012, Geraldo compiled a 11–4 record fighting for regional Brazilian promotions, most notably for Shooto Brazil, where he won the Bantamweight title by beating Luciano Benicio by decision.

Ultimate Fighting Championship

Geraldo made his UFC debut at lightweight against Felipe Colares on February 2, 2019 at UFC Fight Night: Assunção vs. Moraes 2. He won the fight via unanimous decision.

Geraldo faced Chris Gutiérrez on August 10, 2019 at UFC Fight Night: Shevchenko vs. Carmouche 2. He lost the fight via a split decision. 7 out of 11 media scores gave it to Geraldo.

He was then expected to face Jack Shore at UFC Fight Night: Woodley vs. Edwards on March 21, 2020. However, the whole event was cancelled due to the COVID-19 pandemic.

Geraldo faced Tony Gravely on November 14, 2020 at UFC Fight Night: Felder vs. dos Anjos. He lost the fight via unanimous decision. 15 out of 16 media scores gave it to Gravely.

On March 4, 2021, it was announced that Geraldo was released from UFC.

Post UFC 
Geraldo made his return for the first time after getting released on July 24, 2021 at Shooto Brazil 107 against Marcos Cordeiro. He won the bout via armbar in the first round.

On October 13, 2021 USADA announced today that an independent arbitrator has rendered a two-year period of ineligibility for an anti-doping policy violation that he committed while he was in the UFC program. Freitas tested positive for exogenous administration of testosterone and/or its precursors as the result of an out-of-competition drug test collected on October 14, 2020. The two-year period of ineligibility began on January 11, 2021.

Geraldo faced Rogerio Ferreira on November 19, 2022 at MAC 3, winning the bout via first-round rear-naked submission.

Personal life 

The nickname "Spartan" is in honor of his friend who died, Igor Silva. Igor was very supportive of Geraldo's dream of becoming a professional MMA fighter. When he was starting out, they used to watch the “300” movie, and Igor would encourage Geraldo by saying they were Spartan warriors.

Championships and achievements 

 Shooto Brazil
 Shooto Brazil Bantamweight Championship (One Time)

Mixed martial arts record

|-
|Win
|align=center|14–6
|Rogerio Ferreira
|Submission (rear-naked choke)
|MAC 3
|
|align=center|1
|align=center|1:29
|Rio de Janeiro, Brazil
| 
|-
| Win
| align=center| 13–6
| Marcos Cordeiro
|Submission (armlock)
|Shooto Brazil 107
|
|align=center|1
|align=center|3:12
|Rio de Janeiro, Brazil
|
|-
| Loss
| align=center| 12–6
| Tony Gravely
| Decision (split)
|UFC Fight Night: Felder vs. dos Anjos 
|
|align=center|3
|align=center|5:00
|Las Vegas, Nevada, United States
| 
|-
| Loss
| align=center| 12–5
| Chris Gutiérrez
|Decision (split)
|UFC Fight Night: Shevchenko vs. Carmouche 2
|
|align=center|3
|align=center|5:00
|Montevideo, Uruguay
| 
|-
| Win
| align=center| 12–4
| Felipe Colares
|Decision (unanimous)
|UFC Fight Night: Assunção vs. Moraes 2
|
|align=center|3
|align=center|5:00
|Fortaleza, Brazil
|
|-
| Win
| align=center| 11–4
| Rafael Rafael
| Submission (rear-naked choke)
| Shooto Brazil 83
| 
| align=center| 1
| align=center| 2:37
| Rio de Janeiro, Brazil
| 
|-
| Win
| align=center| 10–4
| Luciano Benicio
| Decision (unanimous)
| Shooto Brazil 74
| 
|align=center|3
|align=center|5:00
| Rio de Janeiro, Brazil
| 
|-
| Win
| align=center| 9–4
| Zeilton Rodrigues
| Decision (unanimous)
| Shooto Brazil 72
| 
|align=center|3
|align=center|5:00
| Rio de Janeiro, Brazil
|
|-
| Win
| align=center| 8–4
| Wallace Portella
| Submission (armbar)
| Watch Out Combat Show 44
| 
| align=center| 1
| align=center| N/A
| Rio de Janeiro, Brazil
|
|-
| Win
| align=center|7–4
| Fabio Pacheco
|KO (punch)
| Jungle Fight 88
| 
| align=center|1
| align=center|1:11
| Pocos de Caldas, Brazil
|
|-
| Win
| align=center|6–4
| Israel Ottoni
|Submission (armbar)
|Jungle Fight 84
|
|align=center|1
|align=center|4:05
|Sao Paulo, Brazil
|
|-
| Loss
| align=center|5–4
| Denis Silva
|Decision (split)
|Jungle Fight 82
|
|align=center|3
|align=center|5:00
|Sao Paulo, Brazil
|
|-
| Win
| align=center|5–3
| Peter Montibeller
| TKO (doctor stoppage)
| Nitrix Champion Fight 23
| 
| align=center| 2
| align=center| 5:00
| Camboriu, Brazil
|
|-
| Loss
| align=center| 4–3
|Bruno Camargo
| Decision (split)
|Bitetti Combat 20
|
|align=center|3
|align=center|5:00
|Armação dos Búzios, Brazil
| 
|-
| Win
| align=center| 4–2
| Adonilton Matos
| Submission (rear-naked choke)
| Bitetti Combat 17
|
|align=Center|2
|align=center|4:17
|Rio de Janeiro, Brazil
| 
|-
| Win
| align=center| 3–2
| Julio Cesar
| TKO (doctor stoppage)
| Luta Contra o Crack: Fight Against Crack
| 
| align=center| 3
| align=center| 0:00
| Rio de Janeiro, Brazil
| 
|-
| Win
| align=center| 2–2
| Gustavo Prado Faquini
| Submission (armbar)
| Mixed Submission and Strike Arts 3
| 
| align=center| 1
| align=center| 4:20
| Barra da Tijuca, Brazil
| 
|-
| Loss
| align=center| 1–2
| Fred Vieira Rudolph
| Decision (unanimous)
| Super Fight Lafaiete
| 
|align=center|3
|align=center|5:00
| Conselheiro Lafaiete, Brazil
| 
|-
| Loss
| align=center| 1–1
| Eliandro Libania
| Decision (unanimous)
| Shooto Brazil 32
| 
|align=center|3
|align=center|5:00
| Rio de Janeiro, Brazil
|
|-
| Win
| align=center| 1–0
| Uelington Pereira da Silva
| TKO (punches)
| Minas Fight
| 
| align=center| 1
| align=center| 4:19
| Conselheiro Lafaiete, Brazil
|

See also 
 List of male mixed martial artists

References

External links 
  
 

Living people
1991 births
Brazilian male mixed martial artists
Bantamweight mixed martial artists
Mixed martial artists utilizing Muay Thai
Mixed martial artists utilizing boxing
Mixed martial artists utilizing Brazilian jiu-jitsu
Ultimate Fighting Championship male fighters
Brazilian practitioners of Brazilian jiu-jitsu
People awarded a black belt in Brazilian jiu-jitsu
Brazilian Muay Thai practitioners